Dent Island is a subantarctic  rock stack, lying 3 km west of Campbell Island and belonging to the Campbell Island group. It was named by the French 1874 Transit of Venus Expedition to Campbell Island because of its resemblance to a tooth (dent in French).

Birds
The island is part of the Campbell Island group Important Bird Area (IBA), identified as such by BirdLife International because of its significance as a breeding site for several species of seabirds as well as the endemic Campbell teal and Campbell snipe.

Campbell teal
The island is most famous for its Campbell teal, which was thought to have been extinct for more than 100 years until a small group was rediscovered there in 1975. Dent Island is free from predators, especially the rats whose introduction on Campbell Island led to the extinction of the teal there. However, the suitable habitat for the teal on Dent Island is much more limited than its  area would suggest, because a large area of the island is bare rock.

The Campbell teal conservation programme started in 1984 when four birds were transferred from Dent Island to the Pukaha / Mount Bruce National Wildlife Centre. In 1997, a census carried out on Dent Island showed that its Campbell teal population had declined to dangerous levels with only three birds being found.

However the conservation and breeding has been very successful, and in recent years many teals have been reintroduced onto Campbell Island itself, where there is now a population of over a hundred.  Rats were eventually eradicated from Campbell Island in 2001.

See also
 List of Antarctic and subantarctic islands
 New Zealand subantarctic islands
 Megaherb

References

External links 
 Map of Campbell Island

Islands of the Campbell Islands
Stacks of New Zealand
Important Bird Areas of the Campbell Islands